Laurent Bram (born May 31, 1984) is a Luxembourgish tennis player and coach.

ATP Challenger and Futures/World Tennis Tour finals

Doubles (2 titles, 0 runner-up)

Tennis career

Juniors 
As a junior, Bram reached as high as No. 184 in August 2002. He took top junior Josselin Ouanna to 3 sets at the Tournoi International Junior de St Francois.

Davis Cup 
Bram has mainly played in the Davis Cup for his country, where he has a 5–14 win–loss record. He lost to Andy Murray 6–0, 6–0, 6–0 in the 2011 Davis Cup.

External links 

 

Luxembourgian male tennis players
People from Mersch
1984 births
Living people